Theodore Yaotsu Wu (born 20 March 1924) is an American engineer. He is a Professor Emeritus of Engineering Science at the California Institute of Technology. His research contribution includes compressible fluid flow, free-streamline theory of cavities, jets and wakes, water waves and free-surface flows, mechanics of fish swimming and bird/insect flight, wind and ocean-current energy, and internal waves in the ocean.

Early life
Wu came from a Chinese scholar family. His father had a degree in economics and finance, his mother graduated from high school and majored in literature, while his grandfather was a Chinese physician.

During the Japanese invasion, the Japanese airplanes flying overhead eventually inspired him to enter aeronautics in the university.

Education and career
Wu received his BSc in 1946 from National Chiao Tung University in Shanghai (now Shanghai Jiao Tong University), and spent one year teaching upon graduation. In January 1948 he arrived in the U.S. and enrolled at Iowa State University and graduated with an MS in December the same year. After Iowa, Wu went to Caltech, where he shared an office with Julian Cole. Wu was involved in the research group headed by Paco Lagerstrom, where they developed further the asymptotic perturbation method pioneered by Ludwig Prandtl.

Wu received his PhD in (1952), subsequently worked as a research fellow at Caltech for three years, and developed interest in water waves and hydrodynamics, due to inspiration from then Qian Xuesen and von Karman. After three years Wu became an assistant professor of applied mechanics (1955) at Caltech. In 1960, under the influence of G. I. Taylor and James Lighthill, Wu started to work on fish locomotion and bird flight (biofluiddynamics). During his time at Caltech he has also contributed to the field of naval architecture and been involved in the International Towing Tank Conferences.

Wu retired in 1996, but is still very active after his retirement.

Selected publications

References

External links
 Wu at Caltech

1924 births
California Institute of Technology alumni
California Institute of Technology faculty
Chinese emigrants to the United States
Fluid dynamicists
Iowa State University alumni
Living people
National Chiao Tung University (Shanghai) alumni
Members of the United States National Academy of Engineering
Foreign members of the Chinese Academy of Sciences
California Institute of Technology fellows